The positon of the Catholic Church on capital punishment has varied throughout history, with the Church becoming significantly more critical of the practice since the mid-20th century. In 2018, the Catechism of the Catholic Church was revised to read that "in the light of the Gospel" the death penalty is "inadmissible because it is an attack on the inviolability and dignity of the person" and that the Catholic Church "works with determination for its abolition worldwide."

The Church generally moved away from any explicit condoning or approval of capital punishment and adopted a disapproving stance on the issue by the mid-20th century. Modern Church figures such as Pope John Paul II, Pope Francis, and the United States Conference of Catholic Bishops have actively discouraged the imposition of the death penalty and advocated for its abolition. Since the Second Vatican Council, the Catholic Church became staunchly opposed to the death penalty in the vast majority of applications. During his papacy, John Paul II appealed for a consensus to end the death penalty on the ground that it was "both cruel and unnecessary".

Pope Innocent I (405)
Pope Innocent I in his letter Ad Exsuperium, Episcopum Tolosanum (PL 20, 495) defended the death penalty:

Thomas Aquinas (1225–1274) 

In the Middle Ages, Thomas Aquinas reaffirmed this position. The following is a summary of Summa Contra Gentiles, Book 3, Chapter 146 which was written by Aquinas prior to writing the Summa Theologica. In it, Thomas Aquinas supports death penalty.

Reformation period to modern era (1520–1900)

(1520) 
During the Leipzig Debate prior to his excommunication, then-Catholic priest Martin Luther made commentary against the morality of burning heretics to death. His position was given by the 1520 papal bull Exsurge Domine as "[t]hat heretics be burned is against the will of the Spirit"; as such, it was one of the statements specifically in the bull which the pope declared as "condemn[ed], disapprove[ed], and entirely reject[ed] as respectively heretical, or scandalous, or false, or offensive to pious ears, or seductive of simple minds, and in opposition to Catholic truth".

Roman Catechism (1566)
The Roman Catechism or "Catechism of the Council of Trent", in its section on the Fifth Commandment, teaches that civil authority, having power over life and death as "the legitimate avenger of crime", may commit "lawful slaying" as "an act of paramount obedience to this Commandment which prohibits murder" by giving "security to life by repressing outrage and violence". It also states:

Modern era (1900–2013)

Pope Pius X (1908)
The 1908 catechism of Pope Pius X teaches that the death penalty is lawful under the commandment thou shalt not kill:

Catholic Encyclopedia (1911)
The 1911 edition of the Catholic Encyclopedia suggested that "the infliction of capital punishment is not contrary to the teaching of the Catholic Church, and the power of the State to visit upon culprits the penalty of death derives much authority from revelation and from the writings of theologians", but that the matter of "the advisability of exercising that power is, of course, an affair to be determined upon other and various considerations". The 1911 Catholic Encyclopedia further states that:

Pope Pius XII (1952)
In an address given on 14 September 1952, Pope Pius XII made clear that the Church did not regard the execution of criminals as a violation by the State of the universal right to life. He argued:

Various opinions (1978–2001)
Some Catholic writers, such as Cardinal Joseph Bernadin of Chicago, argued against the use of the death penalty in modern times by drawing on a stance labelled the "consistent life ethic". Characteristic of this approach is an emphasis on the sanctity of human life, and the responsibility on both a personal and social level to protect and preserve life from "womb to tomb" (conception to natural death). This position draws on the conviction that God has "boundless love for every person, regardless of human merit or worthiness". 

The United States Conference of Catholic Bishops also advocated for the abolition of the death penalty. During the papacy of Pope John Paul II, the conference stated that "our fundamental respect for every human life and for God, who created each person in his image, requires that we choose not to end a human life in response to violent crimes if non-lethal options are available."

In contrast, theologian and cardinal Avery Dulles argued in a 2001 article that historical Church teaching and the then-contemporary Catholic magisterium do not advocate for the abolition of the death penalty and do not deny the right of the state to impose the death penalty in certain extreme cases. Dulles suggests that the commandment "Thou shalt not murder" permits the death penalty by a civil authority as the administrator of justice in a human society in accordance with the natural law. Dulles argues that the Church teaches that punishments, including the death penalty, may be levied for four reasons:
Rehabilitation – The sentence of death can and sometimes does move the condemned person to repentance and conversion. The death penalty may be a way of achieving the criminal's reconciliation with God.
Defense against the criminal – Capital punishment is an effective way of preventing the wrongdoer from committing future crimes and protecting society from him.
Deterrence – Executions may create a sense of horror that would prevent others from being tempted to commit similar crimes.
Retribution – Guilt calls for punishment. The graver the offense, the more severe the punishment ought to be. In Holy Scripture death is regarded as the appropriate punishment for serious transgressions. Thomas Aquinas held that sin calls for the deprivation of some good, such as, in serious cases, the good of temporal or even eternal life. The wrongdoer is placed in a position to expiate his evil deeds and escape punishment in the next life.

Pope John Paul II

1992 Catechism of the Catholic Church 
The §2267 of the first edition of the Catechism of the Catholic Church (1992; first published in English in 1994) states:

Evangelium vitae, 1997 Catechism 
In his 1995 encyclical titled  (The Gospel of Life), Pope John Paul II suggested that capital punishment should be avoided unless it is the only way to defend society from the offender in question, opining that punishment "ought not go to the extreme of executing the offender except in cases of absolute necessity: in other words, when it would not be possible otherwise to defend society. Today, however, as a result of steady improvements in the organization of the penal system, such cases are very rare, if not practically non-existent." The § 2267 of the second edition of the Catechism of the Catholic Church (1997) was thus changed to:

However, in 2004, Cardinal Ratzinger (later Pope Benedict XVI) suggested that the 1995 assessment of the contemporary situation advanced by John Paul II was not necessarily binding on the Catholic faithful in regard to capital punishment; he wrote:

In January 1999, Pope John Paul II, without changing Catholic teaching, appealed for a consensus to end the death penalty on the ground that it was "both cruel and unnecessary". He said that criminal offenders should be offered "an incentive and help to change his or her behaviour and be rehabilitated".

The 1997 update of the Catechism of the Catholic Church would remain in force until August 2018, when the Catechism was revised once again to take an even firmer stance against capital punishment and advocate for its complete abolition.

Pope Benedict XVI (2011)
In his Post-Synodal Apostolic Exhortation Africae Munus of November 2011, Benedict XVI called for the abolition of the death penalty:

Later that month, Benedict XVI again proposed abolishing the death penalty:

Contemporary period (2014–present)

Pope Francis (2014)
Pope Francis has stated that he is against the death penalty. In 2013, Pope Francis advocated that "capital sentences be commuted to a lesser punishment that allows for time and incentives for the reform of the offender". In 2015, Pope Francis addressed the International Commission against the Death Penalty, stating that: "Today the death penalty is inadmissible, no matter how serious the crime committed." Francis argued that the death penalty is no longer justifiable by society's need to defend itself, and the death penalty has lost all legitimacy due to the possibility of judicial error. He stated that capital punishment is an offence "against the inviolability of life and the dignity of the human person, which contradicts God's plan for man and society" and "does not render justice to the victims, but rather fosters vengeance".

Vatican support for UN campaign against death penalty (2015)
The Vatican had also officially given support to a 2015 United Nations campaign against the death penalty. During a U.N. Human Rights Council meeting concerning the abolishment of capital punishment, Archbishop Silvano Tomasi declared that "The Holy See Delegation fully supports the efforts to abolish the use of the death penalty." The Archbishop also stated:

Modification to the Catechism (2018)
On 1 August 2018, the Congregation for the Doctrine of the Faith sent a letter to the world's Catholic bishops to warn them about the coming change of the teaching on the death penalty in the Catechism. On 2 August 2018, it was announced that the Catechism of the Catholic Church was revised, through a papal rescript, to state that the Church teaches "in the light of the Gospel" that "the death penalty is inadmissible because it is an attack on the inviolability and dignity of the person". The 1 August letter to the Bishops regarding the change stated that it was consistent with the previous teachings of the Catholic Church regarding the dignity of human life, and that it reflected how modern society had better prison systems with a goal of criminal rehabilitation that made the death penalty unnecessary for the protection of innocent people.

The new text reads:

Fratelli tutti (2020) 

In his 2020 encyclical Fratelli tutti, Pope Francis repeats that the death penalty is "inadmissible" and that "there can be no stepping back from this position". He adds that the Catholic Church is committed for the worldwide abolition of death penalty; he explains: "The firm rejection of the death penalty shows to what extent it is possible to recognize the inalienable dignity of every human being and to accept that he or she has a place in this universe."

Subsequent remarks 
On 9 January 2022, Pope Francis stated in his annual speech to Vatican ambassadors: "The death penalty cannot be employed for a purported state justice, since it does not constitute a deterrent nor render justice to victims, but only fuels the thirst for vengeance".

Objections to the current stance 
Two weeks after the Catechism was changed, 45 Catholic scholars and clergy signed an appeal to the cardinals of the Catholic Church, calling on them to advise Pope Francis to retract the 2018 revision made to the Catechism, on the grounds that its appearance of contradicting scripture and traditional teaching is causing scandal.

Thomas Petri, dean of the Pontifical Faculty of the Immaculate Conception, considers that the 2018 change of the Catechism and Fratelli tutti which both declare the death penalty "inadmissible" means that the death penalty is, in fact, in itself admissible since the pope did not qualify death penalty as "intrinsically evil". He considers the change of stance is "a new understanding of punishment". He explains that historically the death penalty from a Catholic point of view is seen first as a mean of retribution, and secondly of rehabilitation of the criminal and of protection of society, but that John Paul II in Evangelium vitae declares that the protection of society was the first objective of death penalty.

Life imprisonment 
In 2014, Pope Francis also proposed the abolition of life imprisonment, which he felt is just a variation of the death penalty. In 2019, he stated: "Life imprisonment is not the solution to problems, but a problem to be solved. Because if hope is locked up, there is no future for society. Never deprive anyone of the right to start over!". In 2020, in his encyclical Fratelli tutti, Francis called life imprisonment a "secret death penalty".

See also
 Inquisition
 Capital punishment in the Bible
 List of people executed in the Papal States

References

Further reading 

 
 

Capital punishment
Christianity and death
Christianity and capital punishment